Awaous lateristriga, the West African freshwater goby, is a species of goby found in marine, fresh and brackish waters (though mostly in freshwaters) along the Atlantic coast of Africa from Senegal to the Cunene River, Angola and also from islands in the Gulf of Guinea.  This species can reach a length of  TL.

References

External links
 Photograph

lateristriga
Freshwater fish of West Africa
Marine fish of Africa
Brackish water organisms
Fish of Angola
Fish described in 1861
Taxa named by Auguste Duméril